James E. McMahon is an American attorney and 38th United States Attorney for the District of South Dakota.

Early life and education
Jim McMahon graduated with a J.D.  University of South Dakota School of Law in 1977.

Career
McMahon was nominated by President George W. Bush to be the United States Attorney for the District of South Dakota in 2002. McMahon was sworn in as U.S. Attorney on May 12, 2002.

Later legal career
McMahon joined in Redstone Law Firm in Sioux Falls, South Dakota, following his departure from the United States Attorney for the District of South Dakota office.

See also
United States Attorney for the District of South Dakota
University of South Dakota School of Law

References

United States Attorneys for the District of South Dakota
Year of birth missing (living people)
Living people
University of South Dakota School of Law alumni